The 12th British Academy Game Awards awarded by the British Academy of Film and Television Arts, is an award ceremony that was held on 7 April 2016 at Tobacco Dock in London. The ceremony honoured achievement in video gaming in 2015 and was hosted by Dara Ó Briain.

Winners and nominees
The nominees for the 12th British Academy Games Awards were announced on 10 March 2016.

The winners were announced during the awards ceremony on 7 April 2016.

Awards
Winners are shown first in bold.

{| class=wikitable
| valign="top" width="50%" |

Ori and the Blind Forest – Moon Studios/Microsoft StudiosAssassin's Creed Syndicate – Ubisoft/Ubisoft
Batman: Arkham Knight – Rocksteady Studios/Warner Bros. Interactive Entertainment
Everybody's Gone to the Rapture – The Chinese Room and Santa Monica Studio/Sony Computer Entertainment
Metal Gear Solid V: The Phantom Pain – Kojima Productions/Konami Digital Entertainment
The Witcher 3: Wild Hunt – CD Projekt Red/CD Projekt
| valign="top" |Her Story – Sam BarlowAlphabear – Spry Fox
Fallout Shelter – Bethesda Game Studios and Behaviour Interactive/Bethesda Softworks
Lara Croft Go – Square Enix Montréal/Square Enix
Prune – Joel McDonald and Kyle Preston
The Room Three – Fireproof Games
|-
| valign="top" width="50%" |Everybody's Gone to the Rapture – The Chinese Room and Santa Monica Studio/Sony Computer EntertainmentAssassin's Creed Syndicate – Ubisoft/Ubisoft
Batman: Arkham Knight – Rocksteady Studios/Warner Bros. Interactive Entertainment
Metal Gear Solid V: The Phantom Pain – Kojima Productions/Konami Digital Entertainment
Star Wars Battlefront – EA DICE/Electronic Arts
The Witcher 3: Wild Hunt – CD Projekt Red/CD Projekt
| valign="top" |Rocket League – Psyonix/PsyonixDestiny: The Taken King – Bungie/Activision
Lovers in a Dangerous Spacetime – Matt Hammill, Jamie Tucker, Adam Winkels, Asteroid Base/Asteroid Base
Splatoon – Nintendo EAD/Nintendo
Tom Clancy's Rainbow Six Siege – Ubisoft Montreal/Ubisoft
World of Warships – Lesta Studio/Wargaming
|-
| valign="top" width="50%" |Fallout 4 – Bethesda Game Studios/Bethesda SoftworksEverybody's Gone to the Rapture – The Chinese Room and Santa Monica Studio/Sony Computer Entertainment
Life Is Strange – Dontnod Entertainment/Square Enix
Metal Gear Solid V: The Phantom Pain – Kojima Productions/Konami Digital Entertainment
Rocket League – Psyonix/Psyonix
The Witcher 3: Wild Hunt – CD Projekt Red/CD Projekt
| valign="top" |Everybody's Gone to the Rapture – Jessica Curry, The Chinese Room and Santa Monica Studio/Sony Computer EntertainmentAssassin's Creed Syndicate – Austin Wintory, Tripod and Bear McCreary, Ubisoft/Ubisoft
Batman: Arkham Knight – Nick Arundel and David Buckley, Rocksteady Studios/Warner Bros. Interactive Entertainment
Fallout 4 – Inon Zur, Bethesda Game Studios/Bethesda Softworks
Halo 5: Guardians – Kazuma Jinnouchi, Nobuko Toda and Peter Cobbin, 343 Industries/Microsoft Studios
Ori and the Blind Forest – Gareth Coker, Moon Studios/Microsoft Studios
|-
| valign="top" width="50%" |Batman: Arkham Knight – Rocksteady Studios/Warner Bros. Interactive EntertainmentEverybody's Gone to the Rapture – The Chinese Room and Santa Monica Studio/Sony Computer Entertainment
Her Story – Sam Barlow
Prison Architect – Introversion Software/Introversion Software
Tearaway Unfolded – Tarsier Studios and Media Molecule/Sony Computer Entertainment
Until Dawn – Supermassive Games/Sony Computer Entertainment
| valign="top" |Until Dawn – Supermassive Games/Sony Computer EntertainmentEverybody's Gone to the Rapture – The Chinese Room and Santa Monica Studio/Sony Computer Entertainment
Her Story – Sam Barlow
Life Is Strange – Dontnod Entertainment/Square Enix
Ori and the Blind Forest – Moon Studios/Microsoft Studios
Splatoon – Nintendo EAD/Nintendo
|-
| valign="top" width="50%" |Her Story – Sam BarlowKeep Talking and Nobody Explodes – Ben Kane, Brian Fetter and Allen Pestaluky
Lovers in a Dangerous Spacetime – Matt Hammill, Jamie Tucker, Adam Winkels
Mini Metro – Dinosaur Polo Club/Dinosaur Polo Club and Playism
Ori and the Blind Forest – Moon Studios/Microsoft Studios
Prune – Joel McDonald and Kyle Preston
| valign="top" |Merle Dandridge – Everybody's Gone to the Rapture as Kate CollinsAshly Burch – Life Is Strange as Chloe Price
Doug Cockle – The Witcher 3: Wild Hunt as Geralt of Rivia
Oliver Dimsdale – Everybody's Gone to the Rapture as Stephen Appleton
Mark Hamill – Batman: Arkham Knight as The Joker
Masasa Moyo – Broken Age: Act 2 as Vella
|-
| valign="top" width="50%" |Rocket League – Psyonix/PsyonixDisney Infinity 3.0 – John Blackburn, John Vignocchi and Bob Lowe, Avalanche Software/Disney Interactive Studios
FIFA 16 – EA Canada/EA Sports
Guitar Hero Live – FreeStyleGames/Activision
Lego Dimensions – Jon Burton, James McLoughlin and Nick Ricks, TT Games/Warner Bros. Interactive Entertainment
Super Mario Maker – Nintendo EAD/Nintendo
| valign="top" |Prison Architect – Introversion Software/Introversion SoftwareDestiny: The Taken King – Bungie/Activision
Final Fantasy XIV: A Realm Reborn – Square Enix/Square Enix
Guitar Hero Live – FreeStyleGames/Activision
Lego Dimensions – Jon Burton, James McLoughlin and Dave Dootson
The Witcher 3: Wild Hunt – CD Projekt Red/CD Projekt
|-
| valign="top" width="50%" |Bloodborne – FromSoftware/Sony Computer EntertainmentGrow Home – Ubisoft Reflections/Ubisoft
Her Story – Sam Barlow
Lovers in a Dangerous Spacetime – Matt Hammill, Jamie Tucker, Adam Winkels, Asteroid Base/Asteroid Base
Rocket League – Psyonix/Psyonix
The Witcher 3: Wild Hunt – CD Projekt Red/CD Projekt
| valign="top" |Rocket League – Psyonix/PsyonixDirt Rally – Codemasters/Codemasters
FIFA 16 – EA Canada/EA Sports
Football Manager 2016 – Sports Interactive/Sega
Forza Motorsport 6 – Ryan Cooper, Bill Giese and Dave Gierok, Turn 10 Studios/Microsoft Studios
Pro Evolution Soccer 2016 – PES Productions/Konami
|-
| valign="top" width="50%" |Her Story – Sam BarlowEverybody's Gone to the Rapture – The Chinese Room and Santa Monica Studio/Sony Computer Entertainment
Life Is Strange – Dontnod Entertainment/Square Enix
Metal Gear Solid V: The Phantom Pain – Kojima Productions/Konami Digital Entertainment
Splatoon – Nintendo EAD/Nintendo
Until Dawn – Supermassive Games/Sony Computer Entertainment
| valign="top" |Life Is Strange – Dontnod Entertainment/Square EnixEverybody's Gone to the Rapture – The Chinese Room and Santa Monica Studio/Sony Computer Entertainment
Her Story – Sam Barlow
Undertale – Toby Fox
Until Dawn – Supermassive Games/Sony Computer Entertainment
The Witcher 3: Wild Hunt – CD Projekt Red/CD Projekt
|}

BAFTA Fellowship AwardJohn CarmackBAFTA Ones to Watch AwardSundown – Steven Li, Aaron Hong, Mclean Goldwhite, Theodore Park, Kenny Regan, Cynthia Cantrell, Gracie May and Jade KimAMD eSports Audience AwardSmite

Games with multiple nominations and wins

Nominations

Wins

References

External links
12th BAFTA Video Games Awards page

British Academy Games Awards ceremonies
2016 awards in the United Kingdom
2015 in video gaming
April 2016 events in the United Kingdom